The Gaudí Awards are the main film awards of Catalonia, celebrated annually in Barcelona. The awards were established in 2009 by the Catalan Film Academy as a continuation and expansion of the Barcelona Cinema Awards (Premis Barcelona de Cinema), originally established in 2002.

The trophy was designed by Montse Ribé and is inspired by the chimneys of Antoni Gaudí's Casa Milà.

Award categories 

 Gaudí Honorary Award: since 2009; now called Miquel Porter Gaudí Honorary Award
 Gaudí Award for Best Film in Catalan Language: since 2009
 Gaudí Award for Best Non-Catalan Language Film: since 2009
 Gaudí Award for Best Director: since 2009
 Gaudí Award for Best Documentary: since 2009
 Gaudí Award for Best Animated Feature Film: since 2009
 Gaudí Award for Best TV Film: since 2009
 Gaudí Award for Best European Film: since 2009
 Gaudí Award for Best Original Screenplay: since 2009
 Gaudí Award for Best Actress in a Leading Role: since 2009
 Gaudí Award for Best Actor in a Leading Role: since 2009
 Gaudí Award for Best Actress in a Supporting Role: since 2009
 Gaudí Award for Best Actor in a Supporting Role: since 2009
 Gaudí Award for Best Cinematography: since 2009
 Gaudí Award for Best Original Score: since 2009
 Gaudí Award for Best Film Editing: since 2009
 Gaudí Award for Best Art Direction:  since 2009
 Gaudí Award for Best Visual Effectes: since 2009
 Gaudí Award for Best Sound: since 2009
 Gaudí Award for Best Short Film: since 2009
 Gaudí Award for Best Costume Design: since 2010
 Gaudí Award for Best Makeup: since 2010
 Gaudí Award for Best Production Director: since 2010

Ceremonies 
The following is a listing of all Gaudí Awards ceremonies:

References

External links 
 Catalan Film Academy
 Review of the First Annual Gaudí Awards (in Catalan)
 Review of the First Annual Gaudí Awards (in Catalan)
 TV3 report on First Annual Gaudí Awards (in Catalan)
 Interview with Director of First Annual Gaudí Awards (in Catalan)

 
Awards established in 2009
Cinema of Catalonia
Catalan awards
2009 establishments in Catalonia
Recurring events established in 2009
Annual events in Catalonia
Events in Barcelona
Spanish film awards